NBA Street Showdown is a basketball game for the PlayStation Portable developed by Canadian studio Team Fusion. It was released in 2005, and is the fourth game in the NBA Street series and the first to be portable. It features the gameplay elements of NBA Street Vol. 2,  but the presentation of NBA Street V3. The game primarily features minigames, shot blocker and arcade shootout, as well as quick game modes. You can play head to head in all of these through ad hoc mode. To unlock courts you play King of the Courts where your objective is to beat a local street team in games, then beat them in a challenge. Some of the challenges are playing the team in shot blocker, or playing them in a game with no trick points. You can play with all current NBA teams and previous teams made up of legendary players.

Reception 

The game received "generally favorable reviews" according to the review aggregation website Metacritic. In Japan, where the game was ported for release on September 29, 2005, Famitsu gave it a score of 30 out of 40.

References

External links 

2005 video games
EA Sports Big games
Electronic Arts games
National Basketball Association video games
Showdown
PlayStation Portable games
PlayStation Portable-only games
Video games developed in Canada